The 2016–17 Australian Athletics Championships was the 95th edition of the national championship in outdoor track and field for Australia. It was held from 30 March – 2 April 2017 at the Sydney Olympic Park Athletic Centre in Sydney. It served as the selection meeting for Australia at the 2017 World Championships in Athletics. Distance events were held separately, with the 10,000 metres taking place at the Zatopek 10K on 8 December 2016 at Lakeside Stadium in Melbourne and the 5000 metres taking place at the Summer of Athletics Meet in Canberra on 11 March 2017.

Medal summary

Men

Women

References

External links 
 Athletics Australia website

2017
Australian Athletics Championships
Australian Championships
Athletics Championships
Sports competitions in Sydney
2010s in Sydney